Achromobacter xylosoxidans (formerly Alcaligenes xylosoxidans) is a Gram-negative, aerobic, oxidase and catalase-positive, motile bacterium with peritrichous flagella, from the genus Achromobacter. It is generally found in wet environments. Achromobacter xylosoxidans can cause infections such as bacteremia, especially in patients with cystic fibrosis. In 2013, the complete genome of an A. xylosoxidans strain from a patient with cystic fibrosis was sequenced.

Bacteriology
A. xylosoxidans is a Gram-negative rod that does not form spores. It is motile, with peritrichous flagella that distinguish it from Pseudomonas species, and is oxidase-positive, catalase-positive, and citrate-positive. It is urease and indole-negative. It produces acid oxidatively from xylose, but not from lactose, maltose, mannitol, or sucrose. It grows well on MacConkey agar and other inhibitory growth media such as deoxycholate, Salmonella-Shigella, and nalidixic acid-cetrimide agars.

It is usually resistant to a variety of antibiotics including penicillins, cephalosporins, quinolones, and aminoglycosides. Ampicillin and carbenicillin, which are penicillins, are an exception. It is variably susceptible to tetracyclines, chloramphenicol, trimethoprim-sulfamethoxazole, and colistin.

Pathogenesis and clinical characteristics 
Originally isolated from patients with otitis media, A. xylosoxidans has since been periodically described as a pathogen of humans. In addition to otitis, it can cause a variety of other infections, including pneumonia, pharyngitis, peritonitis in association with catheters used for peritoneal dialysis, and urinary tract infections. Infection is sometimes associated with underlying immunodeficiency, including immunoglobulin M deficiency, various cancer chemotherapies, inhaled steroids, surgical procedures, prolonged or broad-spectrum antimicrobial treatment for other infections, and cystic fibrosis. It has also been the cause of hospital-acquired infections.

See also
List of sequenced bacterial genomes

References

External links 
UniProt entry for Achromobacter xylosoxidans
Type strain of Achromobacter xylosoxidans at BacDive -  the Bacterial Diversity Metadatabase

Burkholderiales
Bacteria described in 1981